The 2014 Pro Mazda Championship is the 16th season in series history.

The second season of Andersen Promotions' management of the series saw increased car counts with 20 or more cars in many races and 13 drivers competing in all 14 races compared to 2013's nine.

American Spencer Pigot won the title over Canadian Scott Hargrove in the final race weekend at Sonoma Raceway in controversial fashion. In the first race of the weekend, the two made contact on the fourth lap of the race with Pigot leading. Pigot's race was over while Hargrove went on to finish third. In the second race, Neil Alberico, Hargrove's teammate, made contact with Pigot on the first lap, although both were able to continue. On lap 12, Pigot's teammate Kyle Kaiser's car stopped on track bringing out a caution flag, allowing Pigot, who was running sixth at the time, to close up behind the leaders. After the restart, Hargrove, who was leading, began to experience mechanical trouble, and as he fell back to Pigot, made a move that forced Pigot to swerve around him. Hargrove's race was done while Pigot finished fifth and captured the title by 11 points. Pigot captured six race wins in the fourteen races, including the first four races of the season. With the championship Pigot won a Road to Indy scholarship to compete in Indy Lights in 2015.

Alberico finished third in points without a race win. Andretti Autosport's top challenger, Shelby Blackstock finished fourth in the championship, also without a win. Brazilian Nicolas Costa captured one win and finished fifth in points. Other race winners were Kaiser, Jose Guttierez, who won the wild Sonoma race 2, and Garrett Grist who captured two wins but was inconsistent.

American Bobby Eberle captured the Expert Class championship for drivers over 35 years old largely by virtue of entering the most races among such entrants.

Drivers and teams
All teams are American-registered.

Race calendar and results
The series schedule, along with the other Road to Indy series, was announced on October 24, 2013. Unlike previous seasons, all races were in support of the IndyCar Series except the race at Lucas Oil Raceway (lower tiers of INDYCAR race at Lucas Oil Raceway to gain oval experience at shorter tracks). All road and street course race weekends were double-headers. All races were held in the United States.

Championship standings

Drivers' championships

 Drivers must complete 50% race distance to score main points, otherwise 1 point is awarded.

Teams' championship

References

External links
 

Pro Mazda Championship
Indy Pro 2000 Championship